The Cluff Ranch Ponds are located in the Cluff Ranch Wildlife Area at the base of the Pinaleno Mountains in southeastern Arizona. The facilities are maintained by the Arizona Game and Fish Department.

Fish species
 Rainbow Trout
 Largemouth Bass
 Crappie
 Sunfish
 Black Bullhead
 Catfish (Channel)
 Bullfrogs
 White amur
 Carp

References

External links
 Arizona Fishing Locations Map
 Arizona Boating Locations Facilities Map

Reservoirs in Graham County, Arizona
Pinaleño Mountains
Protected areas of Graham County, Arizona
Wildlife areas of Arizona